McAlmond House is a Gothic Revival farmhouse that built in 1862. The house stands on the bluffs of Dungeness near Sequim, Clallam County, Washington. 
The house is the only remain of the New Dungeness settlement, founded by New England sailors in the 1850s, and was built by ship's carpenters for the Captain Elijah H. McAlmond, which served as Justice of the Peace, first county commissioner, sheriff, Deputy United States Marshall, Probate Judge and, in 1863, as a member of the Territorial Legislature. The home remained in the McAlmond family until the mid-1900s, when the last remaining property was put up for sale.

Local legends claim that under Capt. McAlmond's stewardship, the bluffs under the house were used to smuggle Chinese into the United States.

The house was added to the National Register of Historic Places in 1976.

References

Houses on the National Register of Historic Places in Washington (state)
Gothic Revival architecture in Washington (state)
Houses completed in 1862
Houses in Clallam County, Washington
1862 establishments in Washington Territory
National Register of Historic Places in Clallam County, Washington